Dideoxyverticillin A, also known as (+)-11,11′-dideoxyverticillin A, is a complex epipolythiodioxopiperazine initially isolated from the marine fungus Penicillium sp. in 1999. It has also been found in the marine fungus Bionectriaceae, and belongs to a class of naturally occurring 2,5-diketopiperazines. 

Dideoxyverticillin A potently inhibits the tyrosine kinase activity of the epidermal growth factor receptor (median inhibitory concentration = 0.14 nM), exhibits antiangiogenic activity, and has efficacy against several cancer cell lines.  Its reported anticancer mechanism is that it acts as a farnesyl transferase inhibitor. Dozens of semi-synthetic anticancer compounds have been made from dideoxyverticillin A. Dimeric derivatives are reported to have better anticancer activity.

The enantioselective first total synthesis of (+)-11,11′-dideoxyverticillin A, the structure of which contains many sterically congested, contiguous stereogenic centers as well as acid- and base-labile and redox-sensitive functionality, was biosynthetically inspired and achieved with high levels of chemical sophistication.

References

External links
 MIT News - 11,11′-Dideoxyverticillin

Farnesyltransferase inhibitors
Bionectriaceae
Diketopiperazines